The Chittenden-5-1 Representative District is a one-member state Representative district in the U.S. state of Vermont.  It was one of the 108 one- or two-member districts into which the state was divided by the redistricting and reapportionment plan developed by the Vermont General Assembly following the 2000 U.S. Census.  The plan applied to legislatures elected in 2002, 2004, 2006, 2008, and 2010.  A new plan was developed in 2012 following the 2010 U.S. Census, retaining a district designated as Chittenden-5-1.

The Chittenden-5-1 District includes a section of the Chittenden County town of Shelburne defined as follows:

The remainder of Shelburne is in Chittenden-5-2.

As of the 2000 census, the state as a whole had a population of 608,827. As there are a total of 150 representatives, there were 4,059 residents per representative (or 8,118 residents per two representatives). The one member Chittenden-5-1 District had a population of 3,866 in that same census, 4.75% below the state average.

District Representative (as of 2013)
Kathryn Webb,  Democrat

See also
Members of the Vermont House of Representatives, 2005-2006 session
Vermont Representative Districts, 2002-2012

External links
Detail map of the Chittenden-1-1, Chittenden-1-2, Chittenden-5-1, and Chittenden-5-2 districts (PDF)
Vermont Statute defining legislative districts
 Vermont House districts -- Statistics (PDF)

Vermont House of Representatives districts, 2002–2012
Shelburne, Vermont